The Rejected Girl  is a novel by Mongolian author Tsendiin Damdinsüren written in 1929. One of the more notable early Mongolian novels, it was made into a film in the 1960s.

References

Mongolian novels
1929 novels
Mongolian novels adapted into films